"Everybody's Had the Blues" is a song written and recorded by American country music artist Merle Haggard and The Strangers.  It was released in June 1973 as the third single from the album I Love Dixie Blues.

Personnel
Merle Haggard– vocals, guitar

The Strangers:
Roy Nichols – lead guitar
Norman Hamlet – steel guitar, dobro
 Bobby Wayne – guitar
Dennis Hromek – bass, background vocals
Biff Adam – drums

Chart positions
The song was a live recording that was Haggard and The Strangers fifteenth number one on the U.S. country singles chart.  The single stayed at number one for two weeks and spent a total of fifteen weeks on the chart. "Everybody's Had the Blues" was a minor pop hit, reaching No. 62 on the Billboard Hot 100 in the fall of 1973.

References

1973 songs
Merle Haggard songs
1973 singles
Songs written by Merle Haggard
Song recordings produced by Ken Nelson (American record producer)
Capitol Records singles